Manele is a census-designated place (CDP) in Maui County, Hawaii, United States, on the island of Lanai. As of the 2020 census, the CDP had a population of 7. Manele is one of only two census-designated places on Lanai, the other being the much larger Lanai City. Manele is the site of Four Seasons Resort Lanai.
It is the least populated city in Hawaii.

Demographics 

The total inhabitants of Manele is 29 as per the census of 2010.  A hundred percent of the population goes to or has completed high school. 24 inhabitants are white while 5 are Asian. All of the inhabitants of Manele live above the poverty line.

Climate 
The weather in Manele is pleasant. If we look on the average chart of temperature for the past fifty years, we will find that January has the coldest weather with average temperature of 18 degrees Celsius, while July is hottest with an average of 21 degrees. The average rainfall in a year over the last thirty years is 920mm which is 15mm per day.

Chart Reference:

Crime rate 
The indices for both violent and property crime are higher in Manele than the averages for the United States. The crime index is 35.5, compared to 31.1 for the United States. The Property Crime index for Manele is 47.3 which is also higher than the average crime index for the United States which is 38.1.

For Crime Scale, 0 means no crime rate while 100 means maximum crime rate.

Transportation 
There is an airport available in Lanai City, where there are flights every day from Honolulu to Lanai and vice versa. The Island and Hawaiian air service manage this airport. Chartered planes are also available. There is a taxi service, and hotels on the bay provide shuttle service from and to the airport.

References

Census-designated places in Maui County, Hawaii
Populated coastal places in Hawaii